Erez Da Drezner (Hebrew: ארז דה דרזנר, born August 1, 1978) is a Deaf Israeli model, fitness trainer, lecturer, and a finalist in the second season of the Big Brother television show.

Biography
Da Drezner was born in Haifa, Israel, to a mother who has been a hairdresser and owns a jewelry business, and to a father who was a jeweler. He has two brothers.

After graduating from high school, he enlisted in the Israel Defense Forces in the Medical Corps. After his discharge from the army, he studied interior design, cooking and confectionery. He worked as a model at the Elite Modeling Agency, in which he participated in photography for Elle magazine with the model Anya Martirosov. In 2005, he worked as an instructor in special education schools and was active in the "Shema" club.

Participation in Big Brother
When he was 31 years old, Da Drezner became a contestant in the second season of Big Brother in Israel, with the aim of being a positive and inspiring model for the Deaf community. He stated that he wanted the watchers to learn to accept the Deaf and hard of hearing people as they were. Further, he stated that his motto was "Positive Energies" alongside "And whatever", and became one of the standout characters of this season. Da Drezner's participation in the program caused an echo in the Deaf community, which saw him as a groundbreaking figure. Da Drezner was also featured in several episodes of the television show Eretz Nehederet, played by Eli Finish.

105 days after entering the Big Brother house, Da Drezner was expelled after reaching sixth place.

In 2010 and 2011, he wrote a weekly column on the Mako website about the tenants in the Big Brother show.

In 2012, he sued the production company and Keshet Media Group, after he allegedly received psychiatric pills during the show that caused him side effects, including depression and dysfunction.

Career
After completing the show, he led in 2010 a nationwide fundraising campaign for Nitzan and Shema Associations, and made lectures in schools across Israel.

In 2011, he participated at a special fashion show in honor of the IGY organization, which ended the fashion week. In 2012, he participated in the winter campaign at the Hutzot HaMifratz complex.

At a demonstration of Deaf people, which was held in front of the government building in Tel Aviv on December 30, 2012, against the cancellation of the interpretation in culture and leisure sections, Da Drezner appeared alongside MK Dov Khenin and the nineteenth Knesset candidates Karine Elharrar, Shai Piron and Stav Shafir.

He also participated in television shows, including Wipeout Israel and Laughter from Work – Shalom Asaig's standup show on Channel 13. He also contested and served on the jury in three beauty pageants for the Miss Deaf: in 2013, he contested in the Miss & Mister Deaf World pageant in Prague, the Czech Republic, and in the same year he contested in the Miss & Mister Deaf International pageant in Sofia, Bulgaria, where he won the title of "Mister Deaf Photogenic". In 2015, he assisted the "Miss and Mister Deaf Japan 2015" pageant, which was organized by MMDI, made a sponsorship of the Harley-Davidson motorcycles upon clothing and accessories, and served as a jury in the contest. In February 2019, he served on the jury with his brother, Tomer Drezner, in the "Miss and Mister Deaf Israel 2019" contest, which was held at the Helen Keller House of the Association of the Deaf in Israel in Tel Aviv.

Da Drezner holds a professional certificate of fitness training from the Wingate Institute and serves as a fitness trainer in Israel and around the world, after receiving a certificate from Holmes Place in 2012 for his degree as an outstanding employee in the fitness department.

In 2014, he participated in the group photography exhibition "Another Illusion" by the photographer Ilan Siman-Tov, together with celebrities of culture and entertainment. He played Samson.

In 2021, Da Drezner joined Grace Model Management in Tel Aviv.

References

External links
 
 
 

1978 births
Living people
Israeli male models
Israeli Jews
Jewish male models
People from Haifa
Israeli deaf people